Drnje is a village and a municipality in the Koprivnica-Križevci County in Croatia. In the 2011 Croatian census, there were 1,863 inhabitants in the municipality, in the following settlements:

Botovo - pop. 272
Drnje - pop. 970
Torčec - pop. 621

Croats form an absolute majority at 93.93%.

History
In the late 19th century and early 20th century, Drnje was part of the Bjelovar-Križevci County of the Kingdom of Croatia-Slavonia.

References

Municipalities of Croatia
Populated places in Koprivnica-Križevci County
Croatia–Hungary border crossings